Jens Vilhelmsen (born 8 February 1985) is a Danish rower. He has won three silver medals at World Rowing Championships.

External links
 

1985 births
Living people
Danish male rowers
World Rowing Championships medalists for Denmark